David Makeléer (1646 – 10 November 1708) sometimes written as David Macklier,  was the Governor of Älvsborg County, Sweden. He served from 1693 to 1708.

Biography
David was the son of baronet John Hans Makeléer (1604-1666). His mother was Anna Gubbertz (c.1595-1653) sometimes referred to as Anna Quickelberg. Anna was the daughter of Hans Gubbertz (c1570-?) and Maichen Maria von Quickelberg (1582-1646). David Makeléer had the following siblings: Carl Leonard Makeléer (1633-1663); Catharina Makeléer (1637-1709); Anna Makeléer (1638-1646); Lunetta Makeléer (1639-1693) who married Joakim Cronman (c1630-1703), a soldier who died at Neumünde; Gustaf Adolf Makeléer (1641-1706) who was a Captain in the Swedish Army who married Sara Carlberg (1647-1701); and Elsa Beata Makeléer (1643-1730). He married Eleonora Elisabet von Ascheberg (1663-1737) in 1679, she was the daughter of Field Marshal Rutger von Ascheberg, Count of Söfdeborg. David then served as the first governor of Älvsborg County, Sweden from 1693 to 1708.

Children
Baron Rutger Macklier (1688-1748) who married baroness Vilhelmina Eleonora Coyet and had as their sons, baron David Macklean, and baron Rutger Macklean.
Count John Adolphus Maclean was general in the army and colonel of the king's life guards.

Ancestors

References

1646 births
1708 deaths
David
David
County governors of Sweden
17th-century Swedish politicians
18th-century Swedish politicians
Swedish people of Scottish descent